Sebelas Maret University (it is colloquially known as UNS or UNS Solo) is an Indonesian public university in the suburban area of Surakarta, Central Java, Indonesia. It was officially founded on March 11, 1976.

History
Sebelas Maret University was established on March 11, 1976. It was named Universitas Negeri Surakarta (State University of Surakarta), hence was abbreviated UNS. Sebelas Maret University is the result of the unification of the five universities in Surakarta, which were:
 Institute of Teacher Training and Education of Surakarta.
 Sports High School of Surakarta.
 Academy of Business Administration of Surakarta.
 Combined University of Surakarta, which comprised several universities in Surakarta, included University of Islam Indonesia of Surakarta.
 Faculty of Medicine of the Department of Defense and Security's National Higher Education Development of Surakarta.

Physical development began in 1980. Under the leadership of Dr. Prakosa, the original campus located in several places were united in the same area. The new area was in Kentingan, on the riverside of Bengawan Solo River, with an area of 60 hectares. In this Kentingan area, the first phase of campus construction ended in 1985.

In 1986, Prof. Dr. Koento Wibisono became rector. Prof. Haris Mudjiman, Ph.D. became the next rector.

Symbol and philosophy 
The symbol of UNS is a flower with four petals as the visualization of the nation, the name of the nation and the state. The petals at top, right, and left sides are the embodiment of tri dharma colleges. The one petal under consists of five units that symbolize the principles of Pancasila. The four petals form a line in sequence to depict the academic unity of UNS.

The flower's pistil head shape is described as Wiku that derives from Pali, meaning "the learned people", a circular writing that is similar with Javanese script is Sangkala Candra, (In count of Java) "Mangesthi Luhur Ambangun Nagara" symbolizes the Java year 1908 or 1976 AD, the founding year of UNS.

Overall the symbol of UNS visualize ideals to build a nation, Candra Sangkala it as a shining Praba, Praba in the history of religion and puppet used by the holy man who's wise and virtuous. The central of symbol is Wiku brain (the learned man) is described as a flame, suggests light that illuminates the eternity of science, toward human welfare. Navy blue's color is a pledge of allegiance and devotion to nation, state, homeland, and science.

Achievements
The increasing quality of the graduates has been marked by the improvement of the grade point averages (GPA), Education Efficiency Figure (Angka Efisiensi Edukasi/AEE), cum laude graduates, and the reduction of study periods. Nationally, UNS is in 11th position in Ministry of Research, Technology and Higher Education's 2017 ranking.

UNS has eleven faculties and one graduate program. UNS offers 151 courses ranging from diploma, undergraduate, graduate, and professional programs, specialist doctor education programs, to the doctoral program. Each of them is supported with certified laboratories, language laboratories with Self Access Center facilities, and computer-managed and information-technology-based libraries such as teleconference and web-based learning. The total number of students has reached 27,500. The number of UNS alumni has so far reached more than 85,000.

Apart from increasing the education quality as the implementation of the second and third dharma of Tri Dharma Perguruan Tinggi (the three main functions of higher level education), UNS aims to improve research product and service for the society. The effort has shown good results; UNS has won 40% of 209 submitted competitive research proposals. It also won research funds/dedication of the funding partnership and cooperation with the Department of Education of Central Java Province.

The efforts to improve the quality of research and community service have been being performed by the Institute of Research and Community Services (Lembaga Penelitian dan Pengabdian Pada Masyarakat/LPPM). In performing its duties, LPPM is supported by Study Centers which become its subordinates.

The university boasts of
 A skin surgeon with a national reputation (Faculty of Medicine), 
 The discovery of starbio and salt resistant rice (Faculty of Agriculture).

Faculties 
The university has eleven faculties and two schools providing courses at the diploma, undergraduate, professional, and specialist levels. Some graduate and postgraduate courses are managed by the Postgraduate School.
 Faculty of Agriculture
 Faculty of Cultural Sciences 
 Faculty of Economics and Business
 Faculty of Education
 Faculty of Engineering
 Faculty of Fine Arts and Design
 Faculty of Law
 Faculty of Mathematics and Natural Sciences
 Faculty of Medicine
 Faculty of Social and Political Sciences
 Faculty of Sports
 Postgraduate School
Vocational School

Campus facilities 

Students mostly come from outside of Surakarta. The Family Medicine master's program received equipment from the Ministry of Health to develop a model of family clinic services, which provide health services, supported the concept of health insurance/Public Health Maintenance Insurance (JPKM). UNS-MC will be used to support teaching and learning activities for the practicum for students Faculty of Medicine and Family Medicine. Participants are students, employees, lecturers, and communities around the campus.

UNS is supported by more than 1,600 lecturers; 4% of them are professors, and 72.9% of them hold either a bachelor's degree or master's degree. It is supported by approximately 900 administrative staff.

IT facilities are the internet network at the university and in each faculty. UNS provides web hosting for faculties and departments which intend to build a website as a sub-domain of www.uns.ac.id. Email is provided free for the academic community. UNS develops Academic Information System (SIAKAD), an educational information technology-based system, so that student registration and Plan Studies Consultation can be performed online.

In the Central Library, UNS is developing UNS Library Automation (UNSLA) to ease the reference and collections search through online media. The library is equipped with a Digital Library, a reference that can be accessed online. UNSLA is the online catalog (only searching the library collection) while the Digital Library serves as a digital reference database (all information from a scientific work can be accessed here).

The Educational Development Institute (LPP UNS) develops educational activities online or E-Learning. Other IT facilities are hot spot and the SAT, to anticipate those who do not have a notebook, UNS has been providing Self Access Terminal (SAT), PC Desktop internet service. Because the number of PCs are still limited, the users are very low charged to avoid the monopoly use of a PC. SAT is also reserved for those who wish to develop skills in ICT.

As a health concern, UNS established the Medical Center serving the UNS academic community and people around the campus as a form of community service. It consists of four divisions: Public Health, Dental, ENT, and Eye. The Medical Center is supported by a doctor and medical personnel, lecturers at the Faculty of Medicine. In addition to the health service center, UNS Medical Center serves as a supporting facility for teaching and learning activities for students of Faculty of Medicine.

Student life 
Student facilities include sports and arts facilities, dormitory, and the Secretariat of SMEs. In sports and arts, UNS has a national standard football stadium with stands, player changing rooms, as well as athletic tracks that are for athletes and for sports learning. The closed sports arena can be used for indoor sports, such as volleyball, badminton, basketball and futsal.

UNS has a Student Center UNS which can be used for academic activities like seminars, workshops, or meetings with a large-scale participant as well as sports activities such as Tae Kwon Do, Jiu Jit Su, Karate, Pencak Silat, etc. UNS has tennis courts in Kentingan and in the Department of Sports Education and Health at Manahan. Sport facilities are scattered in every faculty such as basketball court, volleyball, and badminton.

For the convention hall, UNS has an auditorium with amenities for academic and entertainment activities such as art performances or music concerts. Traditional Karawitan equipment, equipment for modern music, and marching bands are student facilities. UNS builds secretariats for Student Activity Unit at the university and faculty level. UNS has a student dormitory with full residential facilities. Students may live in the dormitory at low cost.

Bus Campus is another facility that can be used in student activities, in and outside the campus with permits that have been set by the institution.

Nurul Huda Mosque is the largest on campus. UNS has other mosques in Kentingan, Manahan, Kleco, and Pabelan. Nurul Huda Mosque is in the campus center, Kentingan. It was established in 1982. Besides functioning for worship, Nurul Huda Mosque serves as a means to instill the values of Islam to the campus community, especially Muslim students.

For other religions, UNS has a church for Christians, Pura for Hindus, and monastery for Buddhists.

Image gallery

References

External links
 UNS website
 
 
 

Universities in Central Java
Universities in Indonesia
Educational institutions established in 1976
ASEAN University Network
Universities using Problem-based learning
Teachers colleges
1976 establishments in Indonesia
Buildings and structures in Surakarta
Indonesian state universities